This is a list of the tallest buildings in Canada. Greater Toronto has 86 (Toronto 83 (including the eight tallest buildings in Canada), Mississauga has 3), Calgary has 19, Metro Vancouver has 14 (Burnaby 7, Vancouver 6, Surrey 1), Montreal has 11, Edmonton has 2 (including the tallest outside Toronto), and Niagara Falls has 1.

Five of Canada's ten largest cities enforce height restriction laws. In Ottawa, skyscrapers could not be built above the height of the Peace Tower until the late 1970s, when the restriction was changed so that no building could overwhelm the skyline. In Montreal, skyscrapers cannot be built above the elevation of Mount Royal. The City of Vancouver has enacted "view corridors" which limit the height of buildings in most areas of downtown.

This list does not include towers, including the CN Tower in Toronto, as they are not technically considered to be buildings.

Tallest buildings in Canada
Buildings are ranked according to their height to architectural top, as provided by the Council on Tall Buildings and Urban Habitat (CTBUH). Click a column header to sort the table in a different way. All sources are up to date as of April 2013. To qualify for this table, a building must be quoted by a reliable source as having an official height of more than 150 metres.

Under construction

Tallest demolished buildings in Canada

This table lists buildings in Canada that were demolished or destroyed and at one time stood at least  in height.

Timeline of the tallest buildings in Canada
In the 20th century, only three cities have been the site of each sequential tallest building in Canada – Montreal, Toronto, and Quebec City.

Tallest building by city
This list ranks Canadian cities with buildings that stand at least 50 m (164 ft) tall, based on standard height measurement. This includes spires and architectural details but does not include antenna masts.

* Denotes project still under construction.
** Denotes city with height restrictions in effect.

Number of tall buildings by city 
This list includes cities with at least five completed high rise buildings over 100 metres high.

See also
 List of tallest structures in Canada
 List of oldest buildings in Canada
 List of tallest buildings in the British Empire and the Commonwealth
 List of tallest buildings in North America

References

 
 
Canada